Fire Station No. 18 may refer to:

Engine House No. 18 (Los Angeles, California), listed on the National Register of Historic Places (NRHP)
Fire Station No. 18 (Denver, Colorado), a Denver Landmark
Steam Engine Company No. 18, Louisville, Kentucky, NRHP-listed
Engine House No. 18 (Detroit), NRHP-listed
Fire Hall for Engine Company No. 18 Nashville, Tennessee NRHP-listed
Fire Station No. 18 (Seattle, Washington), NRHP-listed

See also
List of fire stations